Inside Severn Valley Railway is a six-part series, scheduled to air in 2015 on Channel 7 throughout the United Kingdom, including Big Centre TV in the Midlands or Channel 159 on Virgin Media.

It follows train enthusiast and Severn Valley volunteer Nick Wright, as he takes viewers on a journey across all six stations of the Severn Valley, meeting staff, volunteers and patrons alike, whilst also providing technical knowledge and humorous anecdotes about just what it takes to work on the railway, and how much really does go on behind-the-scenes.

Each episode tackles a different aspect of the railway, from the role of the signalman, to the driver, to the staff that keep the on-site museums alive, Inside Severn Valley Railway pulls back the curtain on a British institution, and allows viewers to meet all the wonderful characters that keep those trains on time, and keep that platform going.

Inside Severn Valley Railway was produced by Studio Vega Myst Ltd.

Series overview

Episodes

Series 1: 2015

References

External links
  Inside Severn Valley Railway 
 Inside Severn Valley Railway at IMDb

2015 British television series debuts
Severn Valley Railway
English-language television shows